Uropterygius nagoensis is a species of moray eels found in the western Pacific Ocean. It was first named by Kiyotaka Hatooka in 1984, and is commonly known as the Nago snake moray.

References

nagoensis
Fish described in 1984